The 1939 George Washington Colonials football team was an American football team that represented George Washington University as an independent during the 1939 college football season. In its second season under head coach William Reinhart, the team compiled a 5–3 record and outscored opponents by a total of 78 to 53.

Schedule

References

George Washington
George Washington Colonials football seasons
George Washington Colonials football